ADD-on-GYAN Educational Services (AOGES) is an educational services based in Manipal, Mangalore, India. ADD-on-GYAN has created GyanLab which is a kinesthetic lab facility that encourages and allows school kids (Grades 3-9) to learn practical concepts in science, social science, electronics, robotics, mathematics and Pre-vocational Learning (day-to-day activities and utilities), in a hands-on manner using practical experiments, activities and model-making. The facility is usually set up within a school free of cost and students attend it by paying an annual fee.

History
ADD-on-GYAN Educational Services started as a student project from Manipal University Technology Business Incubator (MUTBI) in 2010. It was set up by two Manipal Institute of Technology (MIT) students Priyadeep Sinha and Abhash Kumar as a student project on 20 January 2011 with Sonali Gupta joining them in the Founding Team.

Products

GyanLab.com
GyanLab.com is an adaptive, personalized online tutor for school students that is developed by the company and launched in March 2016. It emphasizes on teaching the students topics on science, mathematics, robotics and life skills through various hands-on real life experiences and activities.

Kidovators
Apart from offering a wide range of educational services, GyanLab is also known for conducting the annual competition, called Kidovators. 
Kidovators is India's most innovative challenge for school kids. Students from all over India ranging from grade 3-9 participate in this event. According to GyanLab, it is a platform for school students to showcase their intuitiveness and preparedness for life ahead. The challenge is usually conducted in two Rounds. Round 1 is a national level written aptitude conducted at school level. Round 2 is a Practical Challenge where students have to solve real life problems. The round sees top 150 students (of Classes 3 - 8) from all over India compete for the top honour – to be crowned ‘Champion Kidovator of India’ along with a host of other prizes.

Awards
1. GyanLab finished second in the Dell Education Challenge (Austin, Texas), a global competition to improve education, both in and out of the classroom and awarded a cash prize of $5,000.
2. GyanLab was also the winners of the Economic Times Power of Ideas 2012 at Indian Institute of Management Ahmedabad, winning Rs. 5 Lakh as cash prize and Rs.20 Lakh as equity investment.
3. 'Scale Phase Award' at Dell Social Innovation Challenge 2012 at Texas, USA in May, 2012 
4. Winners of Anthah Prerana Challenge by TiE Bangalore in November 2013 
5. 'Global Achievers Award for Educational Excellence - 2012' from Economic Development Forum in March 2012 
6. First Prize at E-pitch Business Contest 2011 at National Institute of Technology, Karnataka in October 2011 
7. Winner of the 3rd Prize at IDEAS B-Plan Contest 2011 at Indian Institute of Technology Kanpur in February, 2011 
8. Finalist at Next Big Idea 2011, conducted by DST and Intel at Indian Institute of Management Bangalore in April, 2011 
9. Finished in top 10 at Big Bang Challenge, Spain in December, 2010 
10. Winner of The Venture, Techtatva'10 in September, 2010 
11. 5th Position at Provenance at MUTBI in October, 2010

References

External links

 Official Website

India Education Program student projects